Le cose da difendere is the seventh studio album by Italian singer-songwriter Nek. It was released in 2002.

Track listing

Charts and certifications

Peak positions

Certifications

References

2002 albums
Nek albums